Windows Embedded Industry, formerly Windows Embedded POSReady and Windows Embedded for Point of Service (WEPOS), is an operating system subfamily developed by Microsoft as part of its Windows Embedded family of products. Based on Windows NT, Windows Embedded Industry is designed for use in industrial devices such as cash registers, automated teller machines, and self service checkouts. Windows Embedded 8.1 Industry was the last release, with Windows IoT Enterprise superseding Windows Embedded Industry, Windows Embedded Standard, and Windows For Embedded Systems (FES).

Releases

Windows Embedded for Point of Service (WEPOS) 

Windows Embedded for Point of Service was released on May 24, 2005, nearly a year after its Windows XP SP2 counterpart was launched by Microsoft in August 2004. WEPOS expanded Microsoft's Windows Embedded family of products. It was the first edition of Windows Embedded that could use the Windows Update Agent to update an installed and deployed image. Service Pack 3 (SP3) for WEPOS was released on October 8, 2008. Mainstream support ended on April 12, 2011, and extended support ended on April 12, 2016. When the new Microsoft Lifecycle Support policy for Internet Explorer went into effect on January 12, 2016, IE6 support was dropped from not only WEPOS, but all other supported platforms.

Windows Embedded POSReady 2009 

Windows Embedded POSReady 2009 offers more features over Windows Embedded for Point of Service such as Full Localization, Internet Explorer 7 and XPS support if .NET Framework 3.5 or higher is installed. This edition was released on December 9, 2008, exactly seven months after its Windows XP SP3 counterpart was launched on May 6, 2008. Prior to XP's end of support, some Windows XP users have reported that the Regedit tool on their operating system can be used to 'trick' Windows Update into accepting updates targeting POSReady 2009. POSReady 2009 is also notable as being the last XP derived operating system to receive official support from Microsoft. Starting in 2017, Microsoft announced end of support for POSReady 2009. Mainstream support for Windows Embedded POSReady 2009—the last supported edition of Windows based on Windows XP—ended on April 8, 2014, and extended support ended on April 9, 2019, marking the final end of the Windows XP codebase after 17 years, 7 months, and 16 days.

Windows Embedded POSReady 7 

Windows Embedded POSReady 7, which is based on Windows 7 with SP1, was released on July 1, 2011, nearly two years after Windows 7 debuted. It is the last supported edition of Windows based on Windows 7 to receive official support from Microsoft. That date marked the final end of extended support for the Windows 7 codebase after 12 years, 2 months and 20 days. Windows Embedded POSReady 7 is eligible for the paid Extended Security Updates (ESU) program (free for Azure Virtual Desktop users). This service is available via OEMs, in yearly installments. Security updates are available for the operating system until at most October 8, 2024. This will mark the final end of Extended Security Updates support, including all security updates for the Windows 7 codebase after 15 years, 2 months, and 17 days. In addition, this will mark the final end of all support for the Windows Embedded Industry subfamily.

Windows Embedded 8 Industry 

Based on Windows 8, Windows Embedded 8 Industry was released on April 2, 2013 and is available in Pro, Pro Retail, and Enterprise editions. The Pro and Pro Retail editions are only available pre-installed on OEM devices, while the Enterprise edition is available through the volume licensing channel only. The Pro Retail edition adds a few extra features for use in retail environments, while the Enterprise edition provides embedded-specific features designed to integrate seamlessly with Windows 8 Enterprise. Alaska Airlines uses Windows Embedded 8 Industry in-flight entertainment devices. Unsupported as of January 12, 2016; users must install Windows Embedded 8.1 Industry in order to continue receiving updates and support.

Windows Embedded 8.1 Industry 
Based on Windows 8.1, Windows Embedded 8.1 Industry was released on October 17, 2013, by Microsoft as a component of the operating system itself. As with 8 Industry, it is available in Pro, Pro Retail, and Enterprise editions. Windows Embedded 8.1 Industry Update was released on April 16, 2014. Mainstream support for Windows Embedded 8.1 Industry ended on July 10, 2018, and extended support ends on July 11, 2023. This will mark the final end of "extended support" for the Windows Embedded Industry subfamily. However, unlike Windows Embedded POSReady 7, Windows Embedded 8.1 Industry (along with other editions of Windows 8.1) is not eligible for the Extended Security Updates (ESU) program, despite its server counterpart being eligible for ESU.

Windows IoT Enterprise 

Microsoft rebranded "Windows Embedded" to "Windows IoT" starting with the release of embedded editions of Windows 10. Windows IoT Enterprise acts as the successor to Windows Embedded Industry.

System requirements

References

Further reading

External links 
  (archived at Wayback Machine)
  (archived at Wayback Machine)

Embedded operating systems
Microsoft operating systems
Embedded Industry